is a romance visual novel developed by HuneX. It was originally released for the PC-FX on April 24, 1998, and was the last game to be released for the system. It received a port to the PlayStation in the same year on November 26. The PlayStation version had additional content and used two CDs instead of one. It is followed by an OVA anime sequel and First Kiss Story II. The game, along with its sequel, were ported to the PlayStation 2 in First Kiss Stories.

Story

High school senior Kana Orikura has felt lonely ever since her boyfriend Yoshihiko left for college. When a handsome new school teacher named Shogo Hayakawa arrives at her school, she falls in love with him because of his resemblance to her father Yuichi who had died a few years ago. The teacher turns out to be her father's cousin, and stays with her and her family at their house.

Adaptations
A single episode OVA sequel to the first game was released on Valentine's Day of 2000. It was directed by Kan Fukumoto.

Notes

References

External links
  Page listing the differences between the PC-FX and PlayStation versions
  PC-FX review at HonestGamers.com
 

1998 video games
2000 anime OVAs
HuneX games
Japan-exclusive video games
OVAs based on video games
PC-FX games
PlayStation (console) games
Single-player video games
Video games developed in Japan
Visual novels